The following lists events that happened during 2014 in Laos.

Incumbents
Party General Secretary: Choummaly Sayasone
President: Choummaly Sayasone
Vice President:  Bounnhang Vorachith
Prime Minister: Thongsing Thammavong

Events
17 May - 2014 Lao People's Liberation Army Air Force An-74 crash

References

 
Years of the 21st century in Laos
Laos
2010s in Laos
Laos